The name Jelawat has been used to name four tropical cyclones in the western north Pacific Ocean. The name was submitted by Malaysia and refers to a carp, which is a fish.
 Typhoon Jelawat (2000) (T0008, 13W)
 Tropical Storm Jelawat (2006) (T0602, 03W, Domeng) – impacted China.
 Typhoon Jelawat (2012) (T1217, 18W, Lawin) – struck Japan.
 Typhoon Jelawat (2018) (T1803, 03W, Caloy) - An early season super typhoon.

Pacific typhoon set index articles